General elections were held in the Cook Islands on 17 November 2010 in order to elect 24 MPs to the Cook Islands Parliament.  The elections were won by the Cook Islands Party, which won 16 of the 24 seats.  Voter turnout was 78%.

A binding referendum on whether the number of MPs should be reduced from 24 was held at the same time as the election.

Parliament will sit for the first time following the election in February 2011.

Background
The Democratic Party government of Prime Minister Jim Marurai, which had governed since 2004, effectively collapsed in December 2009 after Finance Minister Terepai Maoate was sacked for his mishandling of a bid to buy the Toa fuel tank farm.  This resulted in a mass-resignation of Democratic Party cabinet members, the expulsion of Marurai and his supporters, and the withdrawal of support for the government.  Marurai then refused to reconvene Parliament in order to forestall a confidence vote.  A formal split in the Democratic Party was averted in June 2010 when a party conference readmitted Marurai and the other Cabinet members, and appointed Deputy Prime Minister Robert Wigmore as party leader, with Wilkie Rasmussen as his deputy.  However, several senior MPs, including former leader Terepai Maoate and former President John Tangi subsequently failed to win reselection and ran as independents.

In the leadup to the election two sitting MPs announced their retirement: Piho Rua and Speaker of the House Mapu Taia.  Both were members of the Democratic Party.

Parliament was dissolved on 24 September.  Candidate registration closed on 15 October.  70 candidates registered, including 24 from the Cook Islands Party, 23 from the Democrats, 6 from the Te Kura O Te ‘Au People's Movement and 16 independents. Of the 70 candidates, eight were women.

Campaign
The Democratic Party launched its campaign on October 7 in vaka Takitumu with the campaign slogan "Our Future. Now."  The party promised stability, benefit increases, and public service cuts. It contested every electorate except Arutanga-Nikaupara-Reureu.

The Cook Islands Party launched their campaign on October 8, promising an increased child benefit, a $1000 "baby bonus", water tanks for every household and to address the cost of living.  They also promised to prevent "reckless" public spending by making Ministers and public servants personally liable for any misspent funds.

Opinion polls
On 11 September 2010, a poll of 182 voters conducted by the Cook Islands News reported that the Democratic Party had 33% support, the Cook Islands Party 26%, and independents 14%.  The margin of error of the poll was 7%.

A poll of 100 Rarotongans conducted by the Cook Islands Herald on 1 November found that 24% named Democratic Party leader Robert Wigmore as their preferred Prime Minister, 18% preferred Wilkie Rasmussen, 8% Prime Minister Jim Marurai, 5% Cook Islands Party leader Henry Puna, 2% CIP deputy Teina Bishop and 10% others, with 33% undecided.

Results
The election resulted in a two-thirds majority for the Cook Islands Party.  Following the election, CIP leader Henry Puna was sworn in as Prime Minister.

Four electoral petitions were subsequently lodged, challenging the results in the electorates of Pukapuka, Rakahanga, Tamarua and Vaipae-Tautu.  The petitions were heard in January and February 2011.  The results in Rakahanga and Tamarua were upheld.

By electorate
Preliminary results

See also
Candidates in the 2010 Cook Islands general election by electorate
2010 Cook Islands Member of Parliament reduction referendum

References

Elections in the Cook Islands
Cook
2010 in the Cook Islands
Cook